Houcksville is an unincorporated community in Carroll County, Maryland, United States. The Isaac Hoffman House was listed on the National Register of Historic Places in 1985.

References

Unincorporated communities in Carroll County, Maryland
Unincorporated communities in Maryland